Åmsele is a locality situated in Vindeln Municipality, Västerbotten County, Sweden with 209 inhabitants in 2010.

See also
Åmsele murders

References 

Populated places in Västerbotten County
Populated places in Vindeln Municipality